Ranguin station (French: Gare de Ranguin) is a French railway station in a suburb of Cannes, southern France.

The station opened in 1871 when the line from Cannes to Grasse opened to passengers. The line saw a steady decline in passengers and the station was closed in 1995. After much work by the Comité pour la Réouverture de la Ligne SNCF Cannes-Grasse, the line and station were reopened in 2005 and the line was electrified.

Services

The station is served by regional trains (TER Provence-Alpes-Côte d'Azur) to Cannes, Grasse, Antibes and Nice.

See also 

 List of SNCF stations in Provence-Alpes-Côte d'Azur

References

Buildings and structures in Cannes
TER Provence-Alpes-Côte-d'Azur
Railway stations in France opened in 1871
Railway stations in Alpes-Maritimes